Nightmare in Blood is a 1978 American horror film directed by professional late night television horror movie host, and writer, John Stanley.

Plot
Attendees at a horror-film convention in San Francisco keep disappearing. It turns out that the guest of honor is a real vampire, and his henchmen are kidnapping the convention guests. A horror writer, a Sherlock Holmes fan and an Israeli Nazi-hunter set out to stop him.

Production
Primary filming occurred at the Fox Oakland Theatre in Oakland, California. The Fox was renamed the "Palace" in the film.

Release
The film ran in the drive-in theater circuit for nearly a decade and had a wide VHS release in the 1980s.

In 2004, Image Entertainment released the film on DVD.

It had its broadcast premiere with a national syndicated showing on Mr. Lobo's Cinema Insomnia.

References

External links
 
 

1978 films
1978 horror films
American supernatural horror films
Films set in San Francisco
Films shot in San Francisco
American independent films
American vampire films
1978 directorial debut films
1970s English-language films
1970s American films